Noémie Maria Alexis Ghislaine Wolfs, better known as Noémie Wolfs (20 October 1988) from Scherpenheuvel-Zichem is a Belgian singer.

At the age of 22 she became the new singer of the group Hooverphonic in 2010 to follow Geike Arnaert after being selected from about a thousand candidates. She studied graphic design at the University of Ghent. In her youth she mainly listened to the records of her father, like those of Fleetwood Mac and Bob Dylan. In 2011 she received the Radio 2 Summerhit 2011 for Best Singer.

In March 2015, Wolfs left Hooverphonic. She signed a record deal with Universal in the Autumn of 2015. On 3 March 2016, Wolfs presented her first solo single Burning. Wolfs is in a relationship with Simon Casier, bassist of Balthazar.

Discography

Albums with Hooverphonic
 2010: The Night Before
 2010: Hooverphonic with Orchestra
 2012: Hooverphonic with Orchestra Live
 2013: Reflection

Solo albums
 2016: Hunt You
 2020: Lonely Boy's Paradise

Singles with Hooverphonic
 2010: "The Night Before"
 2011: "Anger Never Dies"
 2011: "One Two Three"
 2011: "Heartbroken"
 2012: "Happiness"
 2012: "Unfinished Sympathy"
 2012: "Renaissance Affair" (Version 2012)
 2012: "George's Café" (Version 2012)
 2013: "Harmless Shapes"
 2013: "Amalfi"
 2014: "Ether"
 2014: "Boomerang"
 2014: "Gravity"

Solo singles
 2016: "Burning"
 2016: "Lost In Love"
 2016: "Hunt You"
 2017: "Trying to Pretend"
 2018: "Let Me Down"
 2019: "On the Run"
 2020: "Wake Me Up / Notorious"
 2020: "Love Song"
 2021: "Lonely Boy's Paradise"

References

External links
Noémie Wolfs Noémie Wolfs at Discogs

1988 births
Living people
Belgian women singers
English-language singers from Belgium